Lee Ann Jung is an American educator, professor, author, and international consultant. Jung began her career as a special educator in 1994. Much of Jung's work centers on supporting American international schools to include and support students with disabilities and learning differences. Jung developed and leads an international inclusive leadership program, A program devoted to preparing teachers in international schools in the area of special education and inclusion. She was 2017-2018 chair of the Classroom Assessment Special Interest Group of the American Educational Research Association.

Jung’s primary work is in the areas of assessment and grading for students with disabilities and inclusion in international schools. Her notable works in these areas include the book, Grading Exceptional and Struggling Learners, and a new book, From Goals to Growth: Intervention and Support in Every Classroom. In addition to her five books, Jung's more than 40 articles have appeared in journals such as Phi Delta Kappan and Educational Leadership as well as many other peer-reviewed publications.

References 

Living people
American non-fiction writers
American education writers
Special educators
American women non-fiction writers
Year of birth missing (living people)
21st-century American women